Pancheros Mexican Grill (sometimes referred to as Panch ) is a chain of fast casual Tex Mex restaurants in the United States serving Mexican-style cuisine.  The chain was founded in 1992 by Rodney Anderson when he opened two units: one in Iowa City, Iowa (near the University of Iowa campus), and one in East Lansing, Michigan (near the Michigan State University campus).  There are currently 72 units throughout the country. Pancheros is known for making their tortillas on site, at the time the order is placed. In 2006, Sports Illustrated voted Pancheros the most popular place to eat when bars in Iowa City close.

History

In 1992, Anderson, after just receiving his MBA from the University of Chicago, opened the first Pancheros with capital made from the stock market. The first store was opened in Iowa City, next to the University of Iowa campus. The next 10 locations opened in similar midwestern college towns. It wasn't until 1998 that Pancheros was revamped to include the addition of a dough press for the famous fresh-pressed tortillas, and an updated, more upscale restaurant decor. In 2003 its first non-corporate store opened. Bob the Tool was first introduced in restaurants in 2007.

See also
List of Mexican restaurants

References

External links
Official website

Fast casual restaurants
Mexican-American cuisine
Mexican restaurants in the United States
Companies based in Iowa
Fast-food chains of the United States
Fast-food franchises
Fast-food Mexican restaurants
Restaurant chains in the United States
Cuisine of the Western United States
Restaurants established in 1992
Restaurants in Iowa
American companies established in 1992
Coralville, Iowa